Seyed Hossein Moareb (born 23 August 1947) is an Iranian wrestler. He competed in the men's Greco-Roman 63 kg at the 1968 Summer Olympics.

References

External links
 

1947 births
Living people
Iranian male sport wrestlers
Olympic wrestlers of Iran
Wrestlers at the 1968 Summer Olympics
Sportspeople from Mashhad